DBFC may refer to:

Dengeki Bunko: Fighting Climax
Denzong Boys FC
Deputy British Forces Cyprus
Direct borohydride fuel cell
Don Bosco Formation Center
Don Bosco Foundation of Cambodia
Dynamo Blues F.C.